Tarbet Isle is an island in Loch Lomond, Scotland. It is off Tarbet on the mainland.

References

External links
 lochlomond-islands.com
 Stories and Facts about the Islands of Loch Lomond at incallander.co.uk

Islands of Loch Lomond
Uninhabited islands of Argyll and Bute